Newcastle is an unincorporated community and census-designated place (CDP) in Placer County, California. Newcastle generally has moderate winters and warm summers.

The town's zip code is 95658 and is in area codes 916 and 279.

The population of the CDP as of the 2010 U.S. Census is 1,224.

History
Newcastle was founded in the 19th century.  According to Transcontinental Railroad Landmarks the "Regular freight and passenger trains began operating over the first 31 miles of Central Pacific's line to Newcastle June 10, 1864, when political opposition and lack of money stopped further construction during that mild winter.  Construction was resumed in April, 1865."  The region is also in the vicinity of what was the cradle of "gold country", where in the mid-19th century a flurry of miners and gold prospectors searched for their fortune. During this time, however, the town of Newcastle was known more for its orchards rather than abundant gold mines.

The Newcastle post office opened in 1864.

Geography
According to the United States Census Bureau, the CDP covers an area of 2.4 square miles (6.2 km), 99.82% of it land, and 0.18% of it water.

Demographics

The 2010 United States Census reported that Newcastle had a population of 1,224. The racial makeup of Newcastle was 1,113 (90.9%) White, 104 (8.5%) Hispanic or Latino of any race, 19 (1.6%) Native American, 17 (1.4%) Asian, 7 (0.6%) African American, 35 (2.9%) from other races, and 33 (2.7%) were from two or more races.

The Census reported that 1,216 people (99.3% of the population) lived in households, 8 (0.7%) lived in non-institutionalized group quarters, and 0 (0%) were institutionalized.

There were 545 households, out of which 115 (21.1%) had children under the age of 18 living in them, 258 (47.3%) were opposite-sex married couples living together, 42 (7.7%) had a female householder with no husband present, 23 (4.2%) had a male householder with no wife present.  There were 25 (4.6%) unmarried opposite-sex partnerships, and 2 (0.4%) same-sex married couples or partnerships. 186 households (34.1%) were made up of individuals, and 117 (21.5%) had someone living alone who was 65 years of age or older. The average household size was 2.23.  There were 323 families (59.3% of all households); the average family size was 2.86.

The population was spread out, with 220 people (18.0%) under the age of 18, 83 people (6.8%) aged 18 to 24, 191 people (15.6%) aged 25 to 44, 416 people (34.0%) aged 45 to 64, and 314 people (25.7%) who were 65 years of age or older.  The median age was 51.3 years. For every 100 females, there were 91.3 males.  For every 100 females age 18 and over, there were 92.3 males.

The homeowner vacancy rate was 4.4%; the rental vacancy rate was 12.2%.  923 people (75.4% of the population) lived in owner-occupied housing units and 293 people (23.9%) lived in rental housing units.

Notable people
 Bud Anderson - World War II "triple Ace".
 Joe Bailon - automobile customizer and creator of the paint color Candy Apple Red.
 George S. Nixon - U.S. Senator from Nevada.
 Jason Rhoades - artist.
 John Rudometkin - professional basketball player.
 Caleb Landon - Pop Star and Knitting Enthusiast

References

Census-designated places in Placer County, California
Unincorporated communities in California
Census-designated places in California
Unincorporated communities in Placer County, California